Thomas Shaw  (9 April 1872 – 26 September 1938), known as Tom Shaw, was a British trade unionist and Labour Party politician.

Early life and education
Shaw was born in Waterside, Colne, Lancashire. He was the eldest son of a miner, Ellis Shaw, and his wife, Sarah Ann (née Wilkinson). At age 10, Shaw began working part-time in a textile factory, and two years later quit school to work full-time. Later, he took evening classes to catch up with his education and was particularly skillful in languages. His knowledge of German and French proved useful to him later in his career.

Trade unions
Shaw was a strong supporter of unions. He joined the Colne Weavers' Association and became its secretary, and was a founding member of the Northern Counties Textile Trades Federation. He was Joint Secretary of Labour and Socialist International from 1923–1925. He was secretary of the International Federation of Textile Workers' Associations on a part-time basis from 1911 to 1924 and then full-time from 1925 to 1929, part-time until 1931, and then full-time again, a job that took him to nearly every country in Europe.

Political career
He sat as Member of Parliament (MP) for Preston from December 1918 until he was unseated at the 1931 general election. He served as a Junior Whip, 1919; as Minister of Labour in the Labour Government 1924 and as Secretary of State for War from 1929–1931.

During the First World War, Shaw served as Director of national service for the West Midland Region. He was appointed a Commander of the Order of the British Empire in the 1919 New Year Honours. and appointed a Privy Counsellor in 1924.

Shaw served on several national commissions. In 1926, he headed a delegation to India investigate conditions in the textile industry there. From 1917 to 1920, he was a member of the Holman Gregory commission on workmen's compensation. He pushed for passage of a bill limiting to the 48-hour working week in 1919 and again in 1924.

Shaw did not support communist ideology, but favoured friendly political and trade relations with Russia.

Personal life

In 1893, Shaw married Susannah Whitaker Sterne Ryan Woodhead. They had four daughters.

Shaw died in September 1938 in Middlesex, aged 66.

References

External links

1872 births
1938 deaths
People from Colne
British trade unionists
Commanders of the Order of the British Empire
Independent Labour Party National Administrative Committee members
Labour Party (UK) MPs for English constituencies
Members of the Privy Council of the United Kingdom
Secretaries of State for War (UK)
UK MPs 1918–1922
UK MPs 1922–1923
UK MPs 1923–1924
UK MPs 1924–1929
UK MPs 1929–1931
United Textile Factory Workers' Association-sponsored MPs